In discrete geometry, geometric rigidity is a theory for determining if a geometric constraint system (GCS) has finitely many -dimensional solutions, or frameworks, in some metric space.  A framework of a GCS is rigid in -dimensions, for a given  if it is an isolated solution of the GCS, factoring out the set of trivial motions, or isometric group, of the metric space, e.g. translations and rotations in Euclidean space.  In other words, a rigid framework  of a GCS has no nearby framework of the GCS that is reachable via a non-trivial continuous motion of  that preserves the constraints of the GCS.  Structural rigidity is another theory of rigidity that concerns generic frameworks, i.e., frameworks whose rigidity properties are representative of all frameworks with the same constraint graph.  Results in geometric rigidity apply to all frameworks; in particular, to non-generic frameworks.   

Geometric rigidity was first explored by Euler, who conjectured that all polyhedra in -dimensions are rigid.  Much work has gone into proving the conjecture, leading to many interesting results discussed below.  However, a counterexample was eventually found.  There are also some generic rigidity results with no combinatorial components, so they are related to both geometric and structural rigidity.

Definitions 
The definitions below, which can be found in, are with respect to bar-joint frameworks in -dimensional Euclidean space, and will be generalized for other frameworks and metric spaces as needed. The frameworks in  consist of maps  that satisfy

The configuration space  is an algebraic set.

Continuous and trivial motions.  A continuous motion is a continuous path in  that describes the physical motion between two frameworks of  that preserves all constraints.  A trivial motion is a continuous motion resulting from the  Euclidean isometries, i.e. translations and rotations.  In general, any metric space has a set of trivial motions coming from the isometric group of the space.

Local rigidity.  A framework of a GCS is locally rigid, or just rigid, if all its continuous motions are trivial.

Testing for local rigidity is co-NP hard.

Rigidity map.  The rigidity map  takes a framework  and outputs the squared-distances  between all pairs of points that are connected by an edge.

Rigidity matrix.  The Jacobian, or derivative, of the rigidity map yields a system of linear equations of the form

The rigidity matrix  is an  matrix that encodes the information in these equations. The row corresponding to the edge  is defined as follows.

Infinitesimal motion.  An infinitesimal motion is an assignment  of velocities to the vertices of a framework  such that .  Hence, the kernel of the rigidity matrix is the space of infinitesimal motions.  A trivial infinitesimal motion is defined analogously to a trivial continuous motion.

Stress.  A stress is an assignment  to the edges of a framework .  A stress is proper if its entries are nonnegative and is a self stress if it satisfies .  A stress satisfying this equation is also called a resolvable stress, equilibrium stress, prestress, or sometimes just a stress.

Stress Matrix.  For a stress  applied to the edges of a framework  with the constraint graph , define the  stress matrix  as

.

It is easily verified that for any two  and any stress ,

The rigidity matrix as a linear transformation 

The information in this section can be found in. The entries of the vector  are velocities assigned to the vertices of a framework , and the equation  describes how the edges are compressed or stretched as a result of these velocities.

The dual linear transformation leads to a different physical interpretation. Consider the equation  where  is a  vector. Hence, the domain of the dual linear transformation is the set of stresses on edges and the image is the set of net forces on vertices. A net force  can be viewed as being able to counteract, or resolve, the force , so the image of the dual linear transformation is really the set of resolvable forces.

The relationship between these dual linear transformations is described by the work done by a velocity vector  under a net force :

In terms of the stress matrix, this equation above becomes .

Types of rigidity 
This section covers the various types of rigidity and how they are related.  For more information, see.

Infinitesimal rigidity 

Infinitesimal rigidity is the strongest form of rigidity that restricts a framework from admitting even non-trivial infinitesimal motions.  It is also called first-order rigidity because of its relation to the rigidity matrix.  More precisely, consider the linear equations

resulting from the equation .  These equations state that the projections of the velocities  and  onto the edge  cancel out.  Each of the following are statements is sufficient for a -dimensional framework to be infinitesimally rigid in -dimensions:

 all its infinitesimal motions are trivial;

In general, any type of framework is infinitesimally rigid in -dimensions if space of its infinitesimal motions is the space of trivial infinitesimal motions of the metric space.  The following theorem by Asimow and Roth relates infinitesimal rigidity and rigidity.

Theorem.   If a framework is infinitesimally rigid, then it is rigid.

The converse of this theorem is not true in general; however, it is true for generic rigid frameworks (with respect to infinitesimal rigidity), see combinatorial characterizations of generically rigid graphs.

Static rigidity 

A -dimensional framework  is statically rigid in -dimensions if every force vector  on the vertices of  that is orthogonal to the trivial motions can be resolved by the net force of some proper stress ; or written mathematically, for every such force vector  there exists a proper stress  such that

Equivalently, the rank of  must be .  Static rigidity is equivalent to infinitesimal rigidity.

Second-order rigidity 

Second-order rigidity is weaker than infinitesimal and static rigidity.  The second derivative of the rigidity map consists of equations of the form

The vector  assigns an acceleration to each vertex of a framework .  These equations can be written in terms of matrices: ,
where  is defined similarly to the rigidity matrix.  Each of the following statements are sufficient for a -dimensional framework to be second-order rigid in -dimensions:

 every solution pair  to the equation above consists of a trivial infinitesimal motion ;
 for every non-trivial infinitesimal motion , there is no acceleration  satisfying the equation above; or
 for each non-trivial infinitesimal motion , there is some equilibrium stress  such that .

The third condition can be written in terms of the stress matrix: .

Prestress stability 

Prestress stability is weaker than infinitesimal and static rigidity but stronger than second-order rigidity.  Consider the third sufficient condition for second-order rigidity.  A -dimensional framework  is prestress stable if there exists an equilibrium stress  such that for all non-trivial velocities , .  Prestress stability can be verified via semidefinite programming techniques.

Global rigidity 

Theorem.  Global rigidity is a generic property of graphs.

Minimal rigidity 

A -dimensional framework  is minimally rigid in -dimensions if  is rigid and removing any edge from  results in a framework that is not rigid.

Redundant rigidity
There are two types of redundant rigidity: vertex-redundant and edge-redundant rigidity.  A -dimensional framework  is edge-redundantly rigid in -dimensions if  is rigid and removing any edge from  results in another rigid framework.  Vertex-redundant rigidity is defined analogously.

Rigidity for various types of frameworks

Polyhedra 
This section concerns the rigidity of polyhedra in -dimensions, see polyhedral systems for a definition of this type of GCS.  A polyhedron is rigid if its underlying bar-joint framework is rigid.  One of the earliest results for rigidity was a conjecture by Euler in 1766.

Conjecture.   A closed spatial figure allows no changes, as long as it is not ripped apart.

Much work has gone into proving this conjecture, which has now been proved false by counterexample.  The first major result is by Cauchy in 1813 and is known as Cauchy's theorem.

Cauchy's Theorem.   If there is an isometry between the surfaces of two strictly convex polyhedra which is an isometry on each of the faces, then the two polyhedra are congruent.

There were minor errors with Cauchy's proof.  The first complete proof was given in, and a slightly generalized result was given in.  The following corollary of Cauchy's theorem relates this result to rigidity.

Corollary.  The 2-skeleton of a strictly convex polyhedral framework in -dimensions is rigid.

In other words, if we treat the convex polyhedra as a set of rigid plates, i.e., as a variant of a body-bar-hinge framework, then the framework is rigid.  The next result, by Bricard in 1897, shows that the strict convexity condition can be dropped for -skeletons of the octahedron.

Theorem.   The -skeleton of any polyhedral framework of the octahedron in -dimensions is rigid.  However, there exists a framework of the octahedron whose -skeleton is not rigid in -dimensions.

The proof of the latter part of this theorem shows that these flexible frameworks exist due to self-intersections.  Progress on Eurler's conjecture did not pick up again until the late 19th century.  The next theorem and corollary concern triangulated polyhedra.

Theorem.   If vertices are inserted in the edges of a strictly convex polyhedron and the faces are triangulated, then the -skeleton of the resulting polyhedron is infinitesimally rigid.

Corollary.  If a convex polyhedron in -dimensions has the property that the collection of faces containing a given vertex do not all lie in the same plane, then the -skeleton of that polyhedron is infinitesimally rigid.

The following result shows that the triangulation condition in the above theorem is necessary.

Theorem.   The -skeleton of a strictly convex polyhedron embedded in -dimensions which has at least one non-triangluar face is not rigid.

The following conjecture extends Cauchy's result to more general polyhedra.

Conjecture.  Two combinatorially equivalent polyhedra with equal corresponding dihedral angles are isogonal.

This conjecture has been proved for some special cases.  The next result applies in the generic setting, i.e., to almost all polyhedra with the same combinatorial structure, see structural rigidity.

Theorem.   Every closed simply connected polyhedral surface with a -dimensional framework is generically rigid.

This theorem demonstrates that Euler's conjecture is true for almost all polyhedra.  However, a non-generic polyhedron was found that is not rigid in -dimensions, disproving the conjecture.  This polyhedra is topologically a sphere, which shows that the generic result above is optimal.  Details on how to construct this polyhedra can be found in.  An interesting property of this polyhedra is that its volume remains constant along any continuous motion path, leading to the following conjecture.

Bellows Conjecture.   Every orientable closed polyhedral surface flexes with constant volume.

This conjecture was first proven for spherical polyhedra and then in general.

Tensegrities 
This section concerns the rigidity of tensegrities, see tensegrity systems for a definition of this type of GCS.

Definitions 
The definitions below can be found in.

Infinitesimal motion.  An infinitesimal motion of a tensegrity framework  is a velocity vector  such that for each edge  of the framework,

 , if  is a bar;
 , if  is a cable; and
 , if  is a strut.

Second-order motion.  A second-order motion of a tensegrity framework  is a solution  to the following constraints:

Universal rigidity.  A -dimensional tensegrity framework  of a tensegrity GCS is universally rigid if it is globally rigid in any dimension.

Dimensional rigidity.  A -dimensional tensegrity framework  of a tensegrity GCS is dimensionally rigid in -dimensions if any other -dimensional tensegrity framework , for any  satisfying the constraints of the GCS, has an affine span of dimension at most .

Super stable.  A -dimensional tensegrity framework  is super stable in -dimensions if is rigid in -dimensions as a bar-joint framework and has a proper equilibrium stress  such that the stress matrix  is positive semidefinite and has rank .

Rigidity theorems 
Generic results.

Infinitesimal rigidity is not a generic property of tensegrities, see structural rigidity.  In other words, not all generic tensegrities with the same constraint graph have the same infinitesimal rigidity properties.  Hence, some work has gone into identifying specific classes of graphs for which infinitesimal rigidity is a generic property of tensegrities.  Graphs satisfying this condition are called strongly rigid.  Testing a graph for strong rigidity is NP-hard, even for -dimension.  The following result equates generic redundant rigidity of graphs to infinitesimally rigid tensegrities.

Theorem.   A graph  has an infinitesimally rigid tensegrity framework in -dimensions, for some partition of the edges of  into bars, cables, and struts if and only if  is generically edge-redundantly rigid in -dimensions.

The first result demonstrates when rigidity and infinitesimal rigidity of tensegrities are equivalent.

Theorem. Then,  is rigid in -dimensions if and only if it is infinitesimally rigid in -dimensions.

The following is a necessary condition for rigidity.

Theorem.   Let  be a -dimensional tensegrity framework with at least one cable or strut.  If  is rigid in -dimensions, then it has a non-zero proper equilibrium stress.

Rigidity of tensegrities can also be written in terms of bar-joint frameworks as follows.

Theorem.   Let  be a -dimensional tensegrity framework with at least one cable or strut.  Then  is infinitesimally rigid in -dimensions if it is rigid in -dimensions as a bar-joint framework and has a strict proper stress.

The following is a sufficient condition for second-order rigidity.

Theorem. Let  be a -dimensional tensegrity framework.

then  is second-order rigid.

An interesting application of tensegrities is in sphere-packings in polyhedral containers.  Such a packing can be modelled as a tensegrity with struts between pairs of tangent spheres and between the boundaries of the container and the spheres tangent to them.  This model has been studied to compute local maximal densities of these packings.

The next result demonstrates when tensegrity frameworks have the same equilibrium stresses.

Theorem. Let  be a -dimensional tensegrity framework with a proper stress  such that the stress matrix  is positive semidefinite.

Global rigidity theorems 

The following is a sufficient condition for global rigidity of generic tensegrity frameworks based on stress matrices.

Theorem.   Let  be a -dimensional generic tensegrity framework with a proper equilibrium stress .  If the stress matrix  has rank , then  is globally rigid in  dimensions.

While this theorem is for the generic setting, it does not offer a combinatorial characterization of generic global rigidity, so it is not quite a result of structural rigidity.

Universal and dimensional rigidity 

A finite set of non-zero vectors in  lie on a conic at infinity if, treating them as points in -dimensional projective space, they lie on a conic. Consider the following three statements:

  is positive semidefinite.
 .

If Statements 1 and 2 hold, then  is dimensionally rigid in -dimensions, and if Statement 3 also holds, then  is universally rigid in -dimensions.

References 

 Geometry